Mycetosancassania is a genus of mites in the family Acaridae.

Species
 Mycetosancassania grifolapholiotae Klimov, 2000

References

Acaridae